Jeong Yun-o (born Jeong Jae-hyun; February 14, 1997), professionally known as  Jaehyun, is a South Korean singer, rapper, television host, and actor. He is a member of the South Korean boy group NCT and its sub-units NCT U and NCT 127, debuting in April 2016 as a member of the rotational unit NCT U and as a member of Seoul-based fixed unit NCT 127 in July 2016.

Jaehyun hosted the television program Inkigayo from October 2019 to February 2021. As an actor, he made his debut with a leading role in the college-romance television series Dear. M (2022).

Early life and education
Jaehyun was born on February 14, 1997, in Seocho District, Seoul, South Korea. Although he was born Jeong Jae-hyun, he later legally changed his name to Jeong Yun-o. Between the ages of 5 and 10, Jaehyun lived and studied in Connecticut in the United States and went by the English name Jay Jeong. As a result, he is fluent in both English and Korean. Jaehyun became interested in music at a young age due to his parents' influence, and learned how to play the guitar and the piano, and later began singing during middle school. His grandmother, a retired professional dancer, was also his guide during dance training. He attended Shindong Middle School and Apgujeong High School. He transferred to the School of Performing Arts Seoul in his second year of high school and graduated in 2016. He used to be a student council president.

Career

2012–2016: Pre-debut 
Jaehyun was cast by SM Entertainment in 2012, discovered by street scouts in front of his school. He auditioned with a performance of "Mama" by Exo. On December 9, 2013, he was introduced as a member of the pre-debut trainee team SM Rookies. In 2014, he participated with fellow NCT members on the show Exo 90:2014, where they performed songs from the 1990s. From January 21 to July 1, 2015, he and groupmate Doyoung were MCs on Show Champion. In July 2015, he and groupmate Ten both competed in Hope Basketball All-Star. In December 2015, Jaehyun performed "A Whole New World" on Disney Channel Korea's The Mickey Mouse Club.

2016-2018: Debut with NCT
In April 2016, Jaehyun officially debuted as a member of the first NCT's sub-unit, NCT U, with the singles "The 7th Sense" and "Without You". On July 10, he made his debut as a member of NCT 127 with their first EP, NCT#127. In March 2017, Jaehyun joined the radio show NCT Night Night as a DJ alongside fellow member Johnny. In November 2017, Jaehyun and Dear released the song "Try Again" for the project SM Station. In December, he was featured in the music video for Wendy and Baek A-yeon's "The Little Match Girl". In January 2018, Jaehyun released the single "Timeless" alongside a new NCT U lineup as part of the SM Station project.

2019–present: Solo endeavors and acting debut 
In October 2019, Jaehyun became one of three hosts for the South Korean music program Inkigayo alongside Minhyuk and Naeun, hosting the show every Sunday. On September 4, 2020, it was confirmed that Jaehyun would make his acting debut in the KBS2 drama Dear. M, which was to be released in 2021, in the role of Cha Min-ho, a second year student in the Computer Science Department at Seoyeon University. The drama was postponed indefinitely for airing after the lead actress, Park Hye-su, was accused of school bullying. After nearly two years of delay, the first six episodes of Dear. M was released globally on June 29, 2022 through the streaming service Viki. Its following episodes were released on July 6, 2022.

On November 2, 2021, Jaehyun was confirmed to star in a KakaoTV web series, a remake of the 2001 South Korean film Bungee Jumping of Their Own, playing the leading role of Im Hyun-bin. On December 9 of the same year, during pre-production, KakaoTV announced the cancellation of the project due to concerns with the LGBT plot from the original film's screenwriter. 

On August 18, 2022, Jaehyun released his first single "Forever Only" as part of NCT Lab. "Forever Only" is described as an R&B song featuring lyrics written by Jaehyun. It received positive reviews from critics, and debuted at number 14 in the United States' Billboard World Digital Songs and at 120 in South Korea's Circle Digital Chart.

On March 9, 2023, Jaehyun was confirmed to debut alongside his fellow NCT members Doyoung and Jungwoo in a new fixed sub-unit. They are set to release an album in the first half of 2023.

Other ventures

Ambassadorship 
Following various successful collaborations with Prada, the brand selected Jaehyun as an ambassador in 2022, citing his influence and unique fashion style as a reason. In 2023, he modeled for Prada's SS23 campaign, making him the first Korean celebrity to be chosen as a model for the brand's main global campaign. Photographed by David Sims, the campaign draws "upon the characteristics of classic Hollywood and European movies - their images are frames within divergent stories, glimpses of an unseen narrative and an unknown script, a tension again between different views, of different lives" and features Jaehyun alongside actors Vincent Cassel, Louis Partridge, Hunter Schafer, Letitia Wright, and models Guinevere van Seenus and Rachel Williams.

Filmography

Television

Radio show

Discography

Songwriting credits 
All song credits are adapted from the Korea Music Copyright Association's database, unless otherwise cited.

References

External links 

 
 Jaehyun at SM Town

NCT (band) members
Living people
1997 births
Male actors from Seoul
Singers from Seoul
SM Rookies members
South Korean male singers
South Korean male idols
School of Performing Arts Seoul alumni
SM Entertainment artists
21st-century South Korean singers
21st-century South Korean male actors